William Jennings "Bobby" Berns (December 10, 1895 – July 22, 1980) was a professional American football player who played offensive lineman for six seasons for the Dayton Triangles.

References

1895 births
1980 deaths
American football offensive linemen
Dayton Triangles players
Purdue Boilermakers football players
People from Linton, Indiana
Players of American football from Indiana